František Zvarík (17 July 1921 – 17 August 2008) was an accomplished theater actor (over 50 years in Slovak National Theatre) and movie character actor. He has appeared in about two dozen Slovak films since the 1940s. Among his accomplishments is the key supporting role of the town commander Markuš Kolkotský in The Shop on Main Street, a film which won the 1965 Academy Award for Best Foreign Language Film.

External links

Notes

1921 births
2008 deaths
People from Vrútky
Slovak film actors
Slovak male stage actors